Lolopo (autonyms: , ; ; Central Yi) is a Loloish language spoken by half a million Yi people of China. Chinese speakers call it Central Yi, as the name Lolopo do not exist in Chinese, and is one of the six Yi languages recognized by the government of China.

Distributiol
The Lolo language is mainly spoken in central Yunnan. It is also spoken on different sides of the China-Myanmar–Laos border.

In Laos, Lolo is spoken in three villages of Phongsaly Province, where the language is usually referred to as Lolopho.

In Myanmar, Lolo is spoken in Shan State. The language is usually referred to as Eastern Gaisu, and they are classified as the Gaisu subgroup of the Lisu people.

Names
Lolo speakers are referred to by a variety of exonyms. Below is a list of exonyms followed by their respective autonyms and demographics.
Mili:  (spoken by about 12,000 people in Jingdong County). Also called Alie.
Enipu 厄尼蒲 ( 'water buffalo people', an offensive exonym used by Lalo speakers):  (spoken in Nanjian County). Spoken by nearly 20,000 people in Weishan County (Qinghua Township) and Nanjian County (in Wuliang, Xiaowandong, and Langcang townships)
Tu 土 (Tuzu 土族):  (spoken by nearly 10,000 people in southern Xiangyun County)
Qiangyi 羌夷:  (spoken by nearly 15,000 people in northern and central Xiangyun County)
Eastern Lalu:  (spoken by nearly 20,000 people in Xinping County and Zhenyuan County)
Lolo (of northeastern Binchuan County): 
Xiangtang 香堂 (spoken in Zhenkang County). Widespread distribution in Jinggu, Zhenyuan, Pu'er, Jiangcheng, Mengla, Jinghong, and Zhenkang counties, with perhaps under 80,000 speakers.
Lolo (of Nanhua County): 
Lolo (of Yao'an County): 
Wotizo:  (Yang 2010:7)

Classification
Yang (2011) proposes this tentative internal classification of Lolo.
Southern Lolo (?)
Western Lolo (Southern Lolopo in Ethnologue)
Xiangtang
Jingdong Lolo (Mili)
Southern Dali Lolo (Enipu)
Nanhua Lolo
Eastern Lalu
Tu
Binchuan Lolo (?)
Yao'an Lolo (Qiangyi) (?)

The Chuxiong Prefecture Ethnic Gazetteer (2013:364) lists the following cognacy percentages between Lolopo 罗罗濮 and other Yi languages in Chuxiong Prefecture.
Ache 阿车: 74.86% (211/282)
Chesu 车苏: 55% (155/282)
Luowu 罗武: 75.89% (214/282)
Shansu 山苏: 78.4% (221/282)
Lipo 里濮: 93.36% (253/271)

Phonology

Consonants 

  is also heard in free variation as a voiced lateral fricative .

Vowels 

 Sounds  are pronounced as syllabic consonants  when following alveolar sibilants, and as  when following  in a low  tone syllable.
 Sounds  are heard as syllabic consonants  when following alveolar sibilants.
 Sounds  are heard as central sounds  when following alveolar consonants.
  is heard as open-mid  following alveolar plosives , a palatal fricative , and within palatalized diphthongs .

Tones

References

External links 
 An audio recording of a word list in Lolopo is archived with Kaipuleohone

Loloish languages